Westport Records was a record label founded 1955 in Kansas City by the Ruf Brothers. It lasted until 1962, just releasing about 20 singles.

See also 
 List of record labels

American record labels
Record labels established in 1955
Record labels disestablished in 1962
1955 establishments in Missouri
1962 disestablishments in the United States